Hantumhuzen is a village in Noardeast-Fryslân in the province of Friesland, the Netherlands. It had a population of around 200 in January 2017. Before 2019, the village was part of the Dongeradeel municipality.

History 
The village was first mentioned in the 13th century as de Hontumhusum, and means "houses near Hantum". Hantumhuzen developed during the High Middle Ages from neighbouring Hantum. It is a terp (artificial living mound) village. The tower of the Protestant church was built around 1200. The church dates from the 13th century and was enlarged in 1335. The church was restored between 1939 and 1942 in Gothic Revival style.

In 1840, Hantumhuzen was home to 269 people. In 1891, the terp was excavated.

Notable buildings
 The Protestant church of Hantumhuzen

Gallery

References

External links

Noardeast-Fryslân
Populated places in Friesland